Mustafa Batuhan Altıntaş (born 14 March 1996) is a Turkish footballer who plays as a forward for 24 Erzincanspor.

Professional career
On 4 July 2015 it was announced on the official Hamburger SV website that Altıntaş signed a contract that will keep him at the club till 2017.

On 8 August 2018, he was signed a 2 year deal with Boluspor.

Personal life
Batuhan's grandfather Mustafa Altıntaş, his father Yusuf Altıntaş, and his uncle Yaşar Altıntaş all played professional football in the Turkish Süper Lig.

References

External links
 
 

1996 births
Sportspeople from İzmit
Living people
Turkish footballers
Turkey youth international footballers
Turkey under-21 international footballers
Association football forwards
Bursaspor footballers
Hamburger SV players
Kasımpaşa S.K. footballers
Yeni Malatyaspor footballers
Giresunspor footballers
Boluspor footballers
Ankaraspor footballers
1922 Konyaspor footballers
24 Erzincanspor footballers
Süper Lig players
Bundesliga players
TFF First League players
TFF Second League players
Competitors at the 2018 Mediterranean Games
Mediterranean Games competitors for Turkey
Turkish expatriate footballers
Expatriate footballers in Germany
Turkish expatriate sportspeople in Germany